Rob Yarnold is a former Radio Presenter/Journalist who was popular in the West Midlands for his work on BBC Hereford and Worcester, BBC Radio Stoke and BBC Radio Shropshire. In Herefordshire and Worcestershire, Rob Yarnold was also the founding Director of Radio Wyvern formerly Severn Valley Radio, which was the first local Radio station for the two counties.

References

Living people
British radio directors
Year of birth missing (living people)